Johanna Maria Magdalena "Magda" Goebbels (née Ritschel; 11 November 1901 – 1 May 1945) was the wife of Nazi Germany's Propaganda Minister Joseph Goebbels. A prominent member of the Nazi Party, she was a close ally, companion, and political supporter of Adolf Hitler. Some historians refer to her as the unofficial "first lady" of Nazi Germany, while others give that title to Emmy Göring.

With defeat imminent during the Battle of Berlin at the end of World War II in Europe, she and her husband murdered their six children before committing suicide in the Reich Chancellery gardens. Her eldest son, Harald Quandt, from a previous marriage, survived her.

Early life
Magda was born in 1901 in Berlin, Germany to an unwed couple, Auguste Behrend and building contractor and engineer Oskar Ritschel. The couple were married later that year and divorced in either 1904 or 1905. Some sources claim their marriage took place before Magda's birth, although there is no evidence to support the occurrence of a prior wedding. When Magda was five, her mother sent her to Cologne to stay with her ex-husband. In 1908, her mother married Richard Friedländer, a wealthy Jewish merchant who lived in Brussels, and adopted Magda and gave her his surname. In Brussels, Magda was enrolled at the Ursuline Convent in Vilvoorde where she was remembered as "an active and intelligent little girl". Further contacts with Ritschel, a member of the Krefeld Masonic Lodge in Duisburg, suggest that Magda may have been introduced there to Buddhism.

In 2016, it was reported that Friedländer may have been Magda's biological father, as stated in his residency card, found in the Berlin archives by writer and historian Oliver Hilmes. Magda's adoption may have been required for her parents' delayed marriage, to update the girl's 'illegitimate child' status.

From 1908 until the outbreak of World War I, the family remained in Brussels. In 1914, all Germans were forced to leave Belgium as refugees to avoid repercussions from the Belgian people after the German invasion. The family moved to Berlin where Magda attended the high school Kolmorgen Lycée. Behrend divorced Friedländer in 1914, and in 1919, Magda was enrolled in the prestigious 'Töchternheim Holzhausen' (Ladies' College Holzhausen) near Goslar. While in Berlin, Magda befriended Lisa Arlosoroff and later became intimate with her brother Haim, an ardent Zionist. During her relationship with Haim, she briefly wore a Star of David he had given her and accompanied him to Jewish youth club meetings. The relationship did not last but the two remained in contact during the 1920s until Haim's migration to (British ruled) Palestine, where he later headed the Political Department of the Jewish Agency. Haim was assassinated in Tel-Aviv on June 1933.

Marriage and son with Günther Quandt
In 1920, while returning to school on a train, she met Günther Quandt, a rich German industrialist twice her age. Thereafter, he courted her with courtesy and grand gestures. He demanded that she change her surname back to Ritschel (after having for many years borne the surname of Friedländer), when converting from Catholicism to Quandt's Protestantism. They were married on 4 January 1921, and their first child, Harald, was born on 1 November 1921.

Magda soon grew frustrated in her marriage; Quandt spent little time with her, as his main interest was the expansion of his business empire. The couple had six children – Harald, Quandt's two sons from a prior marriage, and three children of a deceased friend.

In October 1927, the couple went on a two-month visit to the United States, to conduct business with the Lloyd Electric Storage Battery Co. of Philadelphia. In 1929, Quandt discovered that Magda was having an affair, so they separated and divorced later in the year. The terms of the divorce were quite generous to Magda.

Marriage and family with Joseph Goebbels

In 1930, Magda attended a meeting of the Nazi Party where she was impressed by one of the speakers, Joseph Goebbels, then the Gauleiter of Berlin. She joined the party on 1 September 1930, and did some volunteer work, although she has not been characterized as politically active. From the local branch, Magda moved to the party headquarters in Berlin and for a brief period became secretary to Hans Meinshausen, Goebbels' deputy, before being invited to take charge of Goebbels' own private papers. She and Goebbels became romantically involved while on a short trip with friends to Weimar in February 1931. A relationship began and by April they began making plans for their future together. Goebbels wrote in his diary, "We have made a solemn vow to each other: When we have conquered the Reich, we will become man and wife. I am very happy." Her flat on Theodor-Heuss-Platz (then named the Reichskanzlerplatz) soon became a favourite meeting place for Adolf Hitler and other NSDAP officials.

By September, the Goebbels relationship was experiencing problems. Goebbels was often jealous, and had some concern over the fact that Hitler had grown fond of Magda. Magda decided to advance their wedding date, and the couple were married on 19 December 1931, with Hitler as a witness. Otto Wagener claims that Magda's marriage to Goebbels was somewhat arranged; since Hitler intended to remain unmarried, it was suggested that as the wife of a leading and highly visible Nazi official she might eventually act as "first lady of the Third Reich". Magda was an ambitious woman with social connections and upper class bearing that may have influenced Goebbels' own enthusiasm. Goebbels biographer Peter Longerich concurred with this "plausible" conclusion as well. Meissner contends that Hitler (though undoubtedly impressed by Magda) was an exceptionally close friend of the couple in the early days. Hitler grew very fond of the Goebbels' six children and enjoyed staying at their Berlin apartment, where he could relax and would often arrive there late at night, sitting and talking with Goebbels, with their baby Helga (born 1932) on his lap.  Magda had thus a close relationship with Hitler, and became a member of his small coterie of female friends. She acted as an unofficial representative of the regime, receiving letters from all over Germany from women with questions about domestic matters or child custody issues. After 1933, the Goebbels family became accustomed to the luxurious lifestyle which went with their high social position. Their Berlin home on Göringstrasse was remodeled by Albert Speer and they spent the spring and summers in Kladow. In 1936, they bought a villa on Schwanenwerder island and later another at Bogensee near Wandlitz in Brandenburg.

Joseph and Magda Goebbels had six children: Helga Susanne (1932), Hildegard "Hilde" Traudel (1934), Helmut Christian (1935), Holdine "Holde" Kathrin (1937), Hedwig "Hedda" Johanna (1938), and Heidrun "Heide" Elisabeth (1940).   Joseph Goebbels had many affairs during the marriage. In 1936, Goebbels met the Czech actress Lída Baarová and by the winter of 1937 began an intense affair with her. Magda had a long conversation with Hitler about the situation on 15 August 1938. Unwilling to put up with a scandal involving one of his top ministers, Hitler demanded that Goebbels break off the relationship. Thereafter, Goebbels and Magda seemed to reach a truce until the end of September. The couple had another falling out at that point, and once again Hitler became involved, insisting the couple stay together. Hitler arranged for publicity photos to be taken of himself with the reconciled couple in October 1938. Magda also had affairs, including relationships with Kurt Ludecke in 1933 and Karl Hanke in 1938.

War years
At the outbreak of war, Magda's son by her first marriage, Harald Quandt, became a Luftwaffe pilot and fought at the front, while, at home, she lived up to the image of a patriotic mother by training as a Red Cross nurse and working with the electronics company Telefunken, and travelled to work on a bus, like her colleagues. She was also involved with entertaining the wives of foreign heads of state, supporting the troops and comforting war widows.

Both Goebbels and Magda derived personal benefits and social status from their close association with Hitler, and the couple remained loyal to Hitler and publicly supported him. Privately, however, Magda expressed doubts, especially after the war began to go badly on the Eastern Front. On 9 November 1942, during a gathering with friends listening to a speech by Hitler, she switched off the radio exclaiming, "My God, what a lot of rubbish." In 1944, she reportedly said of Hitler, "He no longer listens to voices of reason. Those who tell him what he wants to hear are the only ones he believes." There is no evidence that Magda attempted to intervene to save her Jewish stepfather from the Holocaust. Though his fate has not been established, it is widely assumed that he perished in the camps. Asked about her husband's antisemitism, she answered: "The Führer wants it thus, and Joseph must obey."

Felix Franks, a German Jew who later became a British soldier, claimed that his grandparents got an exit visa from Germany with the help of Magda Goebbels:

Afflicted with a weak heart and "delicate health", Magda would have extended periods of illness. Towards the end of the war, she is known to have also suffered from severe depression and trigeminal neuralgia. This condition affects a nerve in the face, and although usually harmless is considered to cause intense pain and can be notoriously hard to treat. This often left her bedridden and led to bouts of hospitalization as late as August 1944.

Death
In late April 1945, the Soviet Red Army entered Berlin, and the Goebbels family moved into the Vorbunker, connected to the lower Führerbunker under the Reich Chancellery garden. Magda wrote a farewell letter to her son Harald, who was in a POW camp in North Africa:

Goebbels added a postscript to Hitler's last will and testament of 29 April stating that he would disobey the order to leave Berlin, "[f]or reasons of humanity and personal loyalty". Further, he stated that Magda and their children supported his refusal to leave Berlin and his resolution to die in the bunker. He later qualified this by stating that the children would support the decision [to commit suicide] if they were old enough to speak for themselves.

Magda was among the last to see both Hitler and Eva Braun before they committed suicide on the afternoon of 30 April. On the following day, 1 May, Magda and Joseph arranged for SS dentist Helmut Kunz to inject their six children with morphine so that when they were unconscious, an ampule of cyanide could be then crushed in each of their mouths. Kunz later stated he gave the children morphine injections, but it was Magda and SS-Obersturmbannführer Ludwig Stumpfegger (Hitler's personal doctor) who administered the cyanide. Author James P. O'Donnell concluded that although Stumpfegger was probably involved in drugging the children, Magda killed them herself. He surmises that witnesses blamed the deaths on Stumpfegger because he was a convenient target, having died the following day. Moreover, as O'Donnell states, Stumpfegger may have been too intoxicated at the time of the deaths to have played a reliable role.

Magda appears to have contemplated and talked about killing her children a month in advance. According to her friend and sister-in-law (from her first marriage) Ello Quandt, she told her that they were all going to take poison.

Magda appears to have refused several offers, such as one by Albert Speer, to have the children smuggled out of Berlin and insisted that the family must stay at her husband's side. In the Führerbunker she confided to Hitler's secretary Traudl Junge, that "I would rather have my children die, than live in disgrace, jeered at. My children stand no chance in Germany after the war". The last survivor of Hitler's bunker, Rochus Misch, gave this account of the events to the BBC:

Magda helped the girls change into long white nightgowns. She then softly combed their hair. Misch tried to concentrate on his work, but he knew what was going to happen. Magda then went back up to the Vorbunker with the children. Shortly thereafter, Werner Naumann came down to the Führerbunker and told Misch that he had seen Hitler's personal physician, Dr Stumpfegger, give the children something "sweetened" to drink. About two hours later, Magda came back down to the Führerbunker, alone. She looked very pale, her eyes very red and her face was "frozen". She sat down at a table and began playing patience. Goebbels then came over to her, but did not say a word at that time.

After their children were dead, Magda and Joseph Goebbels walked up to the garden of the Chancellery, where they committed suicide. There are several different accounts of this event. One account was that they each bit on a cyanide ampule near where Hitler had been buried, and were given a coup de grâce immediately afterwards. Goebbels' SS adjutant Günther Schwägermann testified in 1948 that they walked ahead of him up the stairs and out into the Chancellery garden. He waited in the stairwell and heard the shots sound. Schwägermann then walked up the remaining stairs and, once outside, saw their lifeless bodies. Following Goebbels' prior order, Schwägermann had an SS soldier fire several shots into Goebbels' body, which did not move. The bodies were then doused with petrol, but the remains were only partially burned and not buried.

The charred corpses were found on the afternoon of 2 May 1945 by Soviet troops. Magda's face was unrecognizable compared to that of her husband. According to the purported Soviet autopsy of her body, her jawbones and dental remains were found "detached in the oral cavity". The children were found in the Vorbunker dressed in their nightclothes, with ribbons tied in the girls' hair. The remains of the Goebbels' family, General Hans Krebs, and Hitler's dogs were repeatedly buried and exhumed. The last burial was at the SMERSH facility in Magdeburg on 21 February 1946. In 1970, KGB director Yuri Andropov authorised an operation to destroy the remains. On 4 April 1970, a Soviet KGB team used detailed burial charts to exhume five wooden boxes at the Magdeburg facility. The remains from the boxes were burned, crushed, and scattered into the Biederitz river, a tributary of the nearby Elbe.

Portrayal in media 
Magda Goebbels has been portrayed by the following actresses in film and television productions.
 Helga Kennedy-Dohrn in the 1955 West German film Der Letzte Akt (Hitler: The Last Ten Days).
 Yulia Dioshi in the 1971 Eastern Bloc co-production Liberation: The Last Assault.
 Eléonore Hirt in the 1972 French television production Le Bunker.
 Marion Mathie in the 1973 British television production The Death of Adolf Hitler.
 Barbara Jefford in the 1973 British film Hitler: The Last Ten Days.
 Piper Laurie in the 1981 United States television production The Bunker.
 Elke Sommer in the 1982 United States television production Inside the Third Reich.
 Hanna Schygulla in the 1998 Spanish comedy drama La niña de tus ojos (The Girl of Your Dreams).
 Yelena Spiridonova in the 1999 Russian drama Moloch.
 Eva Mattes in the 2001 German comedy Goebbels und Geduldig.
 Jill Richardson in a 2003 episode of the British television series Days That Shook the World.
 Corinna Harfouch in the 2004 German film Downfall (Der Untergang).
 Annette Uhlen in the 2004 German television production Propaganda.
Emma Buckley in the 2005 British television production Uncle Adolf.
Lenka Vlasáková in the 2016 Czech film The Devil's Mistress
Katharina Heyer in the 2019 Netflix series Charité at War

References
Informational notes

Citations

Bibliography

 
 Der Spiegel No. 35/04 Hitlers Ende Spiegels (H. 35, 2004)
 E. Ebermayer, Hans Roos: Gefährtin des Teufels – Leben und Tod der Magda Goebbels (Hamburg, 1952)
 
 Goebbels, Joseph: Tagebücher 1945 – Die letzten Aufzeichnungen (Hamburg, 1977) 
 Anja Klabunde: Magda Goebbels – Annäherung an ein Leben (Munich, 1999) 
 
 
 
 
 Meissner, Hans-Otto (1978). Magda Goebbels – Ein Lebensbild (Munich)
 
 
 
 
 
 Schaake, Erich (2000). Hitlers Frauen (Munich)
 Schneider, Wolfgang (2001). Frauen unterm Hakenkreuz (Hamburg)
 
 Sigmund, Anna Maria (1998). Die Frauen der Nazis Volume 1, (Vienna) 
 
 
 Wistrich, Robert (1987). Wer war Wer im dritten Reich (Frankfurt am Main)
 Wunderlich, Dieter (2002) Göring und Goebbels. Regensburg: Verlag Friedrich Pustet.

External links 

 Home movies of Magda and her children, summer 1942

1901 births
1945 deaths
1945 suicides
Converts to Protestantism from Roman Catholicism
Filicides in Germany
German female murderers
German mass murderers
German murderers of children
Magda
Joint suicides by Nazis
Nazis who committed suicide in Germany
People from Berlin
Magda
Suicides by firearm in Germany
Women in Nazi Germany